The District Council of Streaky Bay is a local government area in South Australia located on the Eyre Peninsula. Streaky Bay is the main population centre of about 1,200 people serving an agricultural district based on farming wheat and other cereal crops, sheep, supplemented by fishing and tourism industries. The district covers an area of 6,251.1 square kilometres with a population of 2,074 people in 2016, according to the Australian Bureau of Statistics. Mayor of Streaky Bay is Travis Barber.

History
The council was established by the District Councils Act 1887 on 5 January 1888. The bounds were defined in the act as "All that portion of the County of Robinson not included in the district of Elliston." This meant that the Hundred of Downer, Hundred of Wallis, a large part of Hundred of Wright south of Venus Bay, and an unincorporated area approximately 100 square miles between the three (proposed to be Hundred of McBeath but never gazetted) within Robinson county were excluded from Streaky Bay council and proclaimed as part of Elliston council instead.

It was, until the creation of the neighbouring District Council of Murat Bay (now Ceduna) in 1925, the farthest outpost of local government in South Australia. In the same year, the District Council of Wudinna was established to the east, annexing the hundreds of Condada, Moorkitabie, Carina, Addison and Travers (about ) from Streaky Bay council to form the north western flank of the new council.

While the town of Streaky Bay was named Flinders until 1940, the municipality has been titled Streaky Bay since its inception. In 1936, it was the largest local government area in South Australia, covering .

Localities

The district's focal point is the town of Streaky Bay; it also includes the localities of Baird Bay, Bockelberg, Calca, Chandada, Chilpenunda, Colley, Cungena, Eba Anchorage, Haslam, Inkster, Kaldoonera, Maryvale, Mortana, Mount Cooper, Petina, Perlubie, Piednippie, Poochera, Sceale Bay, Tyringa, Wallalla, Wirrulla, Westall, Witera, Yanerbie and Yantanabie, and parts of Carawa, Karcultaby, Koolgera, Pimbaacla and Pureba.

Elected members

Chairmen and mayors of Streaky Bay

 Peter Calder Anderson (1927-1938) 
 William John Williams (1938-1949) 
 Gregory John Cash (1949-1954) 
 Arthur Donald Andrew Dodgson (1954-1964) 
 Frederick Allen Bellinger (1964-1971) 
 Alec Malcolm Baldock (1971-1977) 
 Peter John Dodgson (1977-1984) 
 Thomas Aiden McCormack (1985-1987)
 John Wharff (1987-1993 and 1997-2003)
 Keith Johnson (1993-1997)
 Ian Gunn (2003-2010)
 Robert Stephens (2010-2014)
 Sherron McKenzie (2014-2016)
 Travis Barber (2016-?)

See also
 Murphys Haystacks
List of parks and gardens in rural South Australia

References

External links

Council Website
District Council of Streaky Bay on Facebook
@StreakyBayDC on Twitter
LGA Site

Streaky Bay, District Council of
Eyre Peninsula
1887 establishments in Australia